Fast Break (stylized as FastBreak) is a radio sports talk show on DZMM in the Philippines. It is broadcasts every Saturdays from 3:00 pm to 4:00 pm, simulcast on DZMM TeleRadyo and The Filipino Channel worldwide. This program talks about sports news and discussion from the two radio hosts. It is the successor of the old sports program which is Sports Talk, which is hosted by Freddie Webb and Gretchen Fullido.

The radio program became on-hiatus starting March 21, 2020, until further notice due to the COVID-19 pandemic.

Hosts
Current: Freddie Webb

Former: Gretchen Fullido, Boyet Sison

About the Show
The show offers sports news from a different perspective by two broadcast journalists.

The program's spontaneity provides room for a lighter discussion of pressing sports news and more!

See also
DZMM TeleRadyo
DZMM

Philippine radio programs
2014 radio programme debuts